Moose–Wilson Road is a road in the U.S. state of Wyoming; the southern The  of the road outside of Grand Teton National Park is Wyoming Highway 390 (WYO 390). The road runs about  through the Jackson Hole valley from its intersection with WYO 22 east of Wilson on the south to Moose in Grand Teton National Park on the north end.

Route description
The road is the primary route from Jackson, Wyoming to Teton Village and the Jackson Hole Mountain Resort, which is located just south of the national park border. The area along the road to the ski area was originally ranch land, but it has been progressively developed over the years.

After entering the park, the road narrows and winds its way through a forested area along the edge of the mountains. The road's terminus is the park's headquarters and visitor center.

Major intersections

See also

Moose Wilson Road, Wyoming, a census designated place

References

Transportation in Teton County, Wyoming
Roads in Wyoming
Jackson, Wyoming